Pyarey Afzal or Pyaare Afzal  is a Pakistani romantic drama television serial that aired on ARY Digital, directed by Nadeem Baig, written by Khalil-ur-Rehman Qamar and production of Six Sigma Entertainment. The drama  starred Hamza Ali Abbasi and Ayeza Khan in lead roles.

Pyaray Afzal won many people's choice awards from Dawn readers in 2014. At the annual Lux Style Awards, Pyarey Afzal won five awards from seven nominations, including Best Television Play, Best Director for Baig, Best Actor for Abbasi and Best Actress for Khan. Pyaray Afzal also aired in India on Zindagi Channel with the same name. The Express Tribune stated Indian viewers liked "The script, dialogue delivery, background score and overall finesse" and there was much social media response.

Plot
The story starts in the city of Hyderabad where the protagonist Afzal Subhan (Hamza Ali Abbasi) son of Maulvi Subhanallah (Firdous Jamal) is playing Cricket. Afzal spends his time playing sports, cards and betting which his father despises. He has a crush on Farah Ibrahim (Ayeza Khan), the mill owner's daughter, and claims to receive letters from Farah which he reads in front of his friends, although he refuses to disclose the name of the girl. Farah on the other hand is to marry Mahtab (Umer Naru), a family friend, but she does not want to marry him. Farah along with her sister Lubna (Sana Javed) hire Afzal to be Farah's love interest so that Farah can convince her parents that she loves another person, which they succeed in doing so. Meanwhile, Afzal falls in love with Farah and his sister (Anoushay Abbasi) convinces his parents to take marriage proposal to Farah's parents. In the family meeting Farah humiliates and insults Afzal. Heartbroken Afzal leaves Hyderabad for Karachi vowing to never return.

Afzal arrives in Karachi and lives with Babu Hameed (Alie Sheikh) in a rented room. The house is owned by a landlady and her daughter Yasmeen (Sohai Ali Abro). Afzal witnesses an incident in which Wali, Yasmeen's gangster cousin harasses her to marry him. Afzal fights Wali who vows to take revenge and returns after a few days with his men comes and shoots Afzal. Yasmeen is moved by what Afzal has done for her and falls in love with him. Wali taking advantage of Afzal's absence comes to Yasmeen's house again. Babu Hameed attempts to shoot Wali but gets shot instead. Afzal receives the news of Babu Hameed's death and decides to take revenge. Afzal's parents came to Karachi in order to meet him but he runs away before they met him. Undercover Police gets interested in Afzal and decided hire him as a vigilante and pays him to create a gang for targeted killing the criminals. Their first target was Wali and he was assassinated.

Afzal becomes infamous gangster and nobody knows that he actually works for the undercover police. Meanwhile, Farah's psychologist Sibtain proposes to Farah who agrees reluctantly. When Afzal is informed he also decides to get engaged with Yasmeen on the same day as Farah's engagement. Farah's engagement is cancelled when Maulvi Subhanullah has a heart attack. When Afzal hears about his father's heart attack he returns to Hyderabad with Yasmeen. Afzal's parents are initially reluctant to accept him but Yasmeen successfully resolves his issues with his parents. Afzal receives a call from the undercover Police to resume his target killing but he informs them that he no longer wants to be their target killer. Yasmeen is curious about the Farah who writes letters to Afzal.  Afzal, unable to express his feelings to Farah had written letters from Farah to himself. Yasmeen goes to Farah and confronts her. She realizes that Farah is also in love with Afzal. She breaks her engagement with Afzal and decides to go back. Farah calls Afzal and admits to loving him. The police shoots Afzal while they are having this conversation because he had left the undercover police and they had warned him a long time ago that he can not leave his post. As Farah confesses to loving him, Afzal succumbs to his bullet wounds as the drama ends.

Cast

Main 
Hamza Ali Abbasi .. Afzal Sub'han Allah
Ayeza Khan .. Farah Ibrahim
Sana Javed .. Lubna Ibrahim
Sohai Ali Abro .. Yasmeen

Recurring 
Saba Hameed .. Ruqaiyya Sub'han Allah
Firdous Jamal .. Maulvi Subhan Allah
Aliee Shaikh .. Babu Hameed
Anoushey Abbasi .. Arfa Subhan Allah
Saba Faisal .. Irsa Ibrahim
Shehryar Zaidi .. Sheikh Ibrahim
Farah Nadeem .. Yasmeen's mother
Vasay Chaudhry .. Dr. Sibtain
Umer Naru .. Mehtab
Birjees Farooqui .. Mehtab's mother
Malik Raza .. Wali

Saqib Sameer .. Babloo

Soundtrack

The title song of the series "Pyar Ko Pyar Mila" is a remix of a song of the same name of the 1967 Bollywood film Pyaasa.

Reception

Critical reception 
While reviewing the series, Dawn praised the female portrayal and dialogues, but mentioned some writing faux.

In July 2017, it was listed among the 10 iconic Pakistani TV dramas by DAWN Images.

Accolades
The drama serial grabbed all the awards under television category at 14th Lux Style Awards.

References

External links 
 

Pakistani drama television series
ARY Digital original programming
Urdu-language telenovelas
2013 Pakistani television series debuts
2014 Pakistani television series endings
Television series set in Hyderabad, Sindh
Films directed by Nadeem Baig (director)